Mueang Chonburi is the capital district (amphoe mueang) of Chonburi province, eastern Thailand.

Geography
Neighbouring districts are (from the north clockwise) Bang Pakong of Chachoengsao province, Phan Thong, Ban Bueng and Si Racha. To the west is the Bay of Bangkok.

History
On 14 November 1938 the district's name was changed from Bang Pla Soi (บางปลาสร้อย) to Mueang Chonburi .

Administration

Central administration 
The district Mueang Chon Buri is subdivided into 18 subdistricts (Tambon), which are further subdivided into 122 administrative villages (Muban).

Local administration 
There are 4 towns (Thesaban Mueang) in the district:
 Chon Buri consisting of the complete subdistrict Bang Pla Soi, Makham Yong, Ban Khot.
 Saen Suk consisting of the complete subdistrict Saen Suk and parts of the subdistricts Mueang, Huai Kapi.
 Ban Suan consisting of the complete subdistrict Ban Suan and parts of the subdistricts Nong Ri, Nong Khang Khok.
 Ang Sila consisting of the complete subdistrict Ban Puek, Ang Sila and parts of the subdistricts Huai Kapi, Samet.

There are 8 subdistrict municipalities (Thesaban Tambon) in the district:
 Khlong Tamru consisting of parts of the subdistrict Khlong Tamru.
 Bang Sai consisting of the complete subdistrict Bang Sai.
 Nong Mai Daeng consisting of the complete subdistrict Nong Mai Daeng.
 Na Pa consisting of the complete subdistrict Na Pa.
 Huai Kapi consisting of parts of the subdistrict Huai Kapi.
 Don Hua Lo consisting of the complete subdistrict Don Hua Lo.
 Samet consisting of parts of the subdistrict Samet.
 Mueang consisting of parts of the subdistrict Mueang.

There are 4 subdistrict administrative organizations (SAO) in the district:
 Nong Ri consisting of parts of the subdistrict Nong Ri.
 Nong Khang Khok consisting of parts of the subdistrict Nong Khang Khok.
 Khlong Tamru consisting of parts of the subdistrict Khlong Tamru.
 Samnak Bok consisting of the complete subdistrict Samnak Bok.

Economy
Ang Sila is a leading producer of granite mortars and pestles, essential in the preparation of Thai cuisine.

References

External links

Mueang Chonburi